Rose-Marie is a 1928 American silent drama film directed by Lucien Hubbard. It was the first of three Metro-Goldwyn-Mayer adaptations of the 1924 operetta Broadway musical Rose-Marie. The best-known film adaptation starring Nelson Eddy and Jeanette MacDonald was released in 1936; another film was released in 1954. All three versions are set in the Canadian wilderness.

Portions of Rudolf Friml and Herbert Stothart's original score for the Broadway musical are utilized in the 1936 and 1954 films, but not for the silent version.  MGM provided sheet music with the film for playing at the theater. Joan Crawford, who starred in the 1928 version alongside James Murray, later remarked, "Rose Marie was surprisingly good without the music, but I felt uneasy as a French Canadian, but the critics didn't notice."

Plot

Cast
 Joan Crawford as Rose-Marie
 James Murray as Jim Kenyon
 House Peters as Sergeant Malone
 Creighton Hale as Etienne Doray
 Gibson Gowland as Black Bastien
 George Cooper as Fuzzy
 Lionel Belmore as Henri Duray
 William Orlamond as Emile La Flamme
 Polly Moran as Lady Jane
 Harry Gribbon as Trooper Gray
 Gertrude Astor as Wanda
 Ralph Yearsley as Jean
 Sven Hugo Borg as Hudson
 Lloyd Hamilton as Fuzzy - Bearded Trapper (scenes deleted)
 Lou Costello as Extra and Stunt Performer (uncredited)
 Margaret Lee as Extra (uncredited)

Production
"Rose-Marie" was initially filmed with Renee Adoree in the lead and William Nigh directing. After two weeks of location filming at Yosemite National Park, the studio shut down the production, fired Nigh, and brought Lucien Hubbard in to produce and write a new screenplay. Another director, Edmund Goulding, was assigned, and he re-cast the picture, selecting Joan Crawford for the lead role. Goulding, although referenced in the trade press throughout the production, was ultimately not credited as director.

Reception
Norbert Lusk summed up the response of New York critics: "'Rose-Marie'...has proved disappointing. With unusual unanimity the reviewers rate it just another story about the Northwest Mounted Police, which never reaches more than lukewarm interest in spite of good acting and, of course, beautiful scenery. It's strongest asset is its title, which will doubtless draw in the absence of word-of-mouth advertising." Mae Tinee, writing in the Chicago Daily Tribune, called the film "charming," but felt that Crawford "has not the fire and depth that Miss Adoree brings to her characterizations."

Preservation status
Rose-Marie is considered to be a lost film. MGM once had a policy, when a film was remade, to destroy prints of the original film, so prints of this film may have been destroyed when the 1936 remake was released.

References

External links

 
 
 
 
 Still of Crawford and Murray at gettyimages.com

1928 films
1928 drama films
Silent American drama films
American silent feature films
American black-and-white films
American films based on plays
Lost American films
Metro-Goldwyn-Mayer films
1928 lost films
Lost drama films
1920s English-language films
1920s American films